Securing Sex: Morality and Repression in the Making of Cold War Brazil is a book by Benjamin A. Cowan published by the University of North Carolina Press in 2016. It discusses how the right-wing activist, attitude, and government during the Cold War caused a transnational network of repressive laws and attitudes. The book also discusses how this "moral panic" made villains out of Communist and equating them to sexual deviants and queer people.

Synopsis
Benjamin Cowan explores the repression that existed during mid Cold War Brazil and beyond. He discusses how the Right Wing activist use the military regime in Brazil to spread a very "modest" and "morally correct" population, attitudes, and laws. Cowan tackles this subject by using the voices and perspectives of Right Wing activist. Cowan uses records from unused archives, something that people have not been doing. Cowan also attributes these attitudes to current perspectives of sexually liberate people, women, and queer people. Cowan uses some of the chapters to his advantage. He poses a question as the chapter title and in the next chapter he answers it. (Chapter 2: Sexual Revolution? and Chapter 3: Sexual Revolution!). He also goes through the years of the military dictatorship in relation to the certain topic of women being used as a tool to turn against rebels and how young men were seen as heroes.

Critical Reception
Securing Sex  was extremely well received by academics, especially Brazil experts. Most reviews comment on the use of Right wing perspectives and how it is "extremely balanced".

Review by James N. Green in the Journal of Social History.

Bryan McCann begins his review as saying that Cowan's work is a "major contribution to our understanding of the Brazilian military dictatorship of 1964 to 1985".

Review by Bryan McCann in the Journal of Interdisciplinary History 48 (2017): 112–113.

Awards
Securing Sex won the 2017 Brazil Section Award from the Latin American Studies Association.

References

2016 non-fiction books
Books about Brazil
Books about the Cold War
Far-right politics in Brazil
University of North Carolina Press books